Metro is a franchise consisting of novels and video games, which began with the release of Dmitry Glukhovsky's Metro 2033 novel in 2005. Although it began in Russia, the franchise has been rising in popularity outside of Russia. Ukrainian studio 4A Games had developed three video games set in the universe: Metro 2033 (2010), Metro: Last Light (2013) and Metro Exodus (2019).

All of the Metro stories share the same setting – the fictional world of Glukhovsky's original novel. Although it described only his own vision of a post-apocalyptic Moscow, the books of the extended universe take place in a wide variety of different areas. Among these are: Moscow, St. Petersburg, Leningrad Oblast, Nizhny Novgorod, Tver Oblast, Moscow Oblast, Kola Peninsula, Rostov-on-Don, Samara, Novosibirsk, Yekaterinburg, and the Kaliningrad oblast. Some of the books in the series are set in other locations outside of Russia, such as Ukraine, Belarus, United Kingdom, Italy, Poland, and Antarctica.

Video games 
A first-person shooter video game titled Metro 2033 was created for Microsoft Windows and Xbox 360 gaming platforms. It was developed by 4A Games in Ukraine and published in March 2010 by THQ. A sequel, Metro: Last Light, was released in May 2013 on Microsoft Windows, Xbox 360 and PlayStation 3. Redux versions of the games were released in 2014, featuring updated graphics and gameplay with all previously released downloadable content bundled. The Metro Redux bundle was released for the PC, Xbox One and PlayStation 4. A third game, Metro Exodus, was released in February 2019.

Other novels 
The Universe of Metro 2033 is a series of short stories, novellas, and novels, spanning a variety of genres ranging from post-apocalyptic action to romance, written by several different authors. Despite being written by various authors, the stories of the extended Metro series are all supported by Dmitry Glukhovsky and advertised on the official Metro website.

Translations 
Most of the written works of the series were originally released in Russia. Some books from the universe of Metro 2033, like Piter, Towards the Light and Into the Darkness, have been translated to a number of European languages, such as German, Polish and Swedish. Prior to 2014 and the video games Metro 2033 and Metro: Last Light, no books in the series were released in a country where English is the prominent language.

Other media 

A graphic novel titled Metro 2033: Britannia Comic Prologue inspired by the prologue of the Metro 2033 novel Britannia was published in 2012. The story was written by Grant McMaster, the author of the novel and is illustrated by Benedict Hollis. It is available as a free download and unlike the novels it is in English rather than Russian.

A Metro 2033 board game based on the original novel was released in 2011. It was designed by Sergei Golubkin and was published by Hobby World.

The Metro series was also being developed into films by Michael De Luca and Solipsist Films, but the deal has been cancelled by Glukhovsky due to his disapproval to their Americanization of his work. The new and only Russian Metro 2033 film adaptation project was announced in 2019 for the planned 2022 release.

References

External links 

 Metro 2033 portal 

Metro 2033
Metro 2033
Embracer Group franchises
Science fiction franchises